Gilda Olvidado (born 9 August 1957 in Cebu City, Cebu) is a Filipina movie and television writer, and melodrama novelist. Her novels have been turned into live-action movies by VIVA Films, and also been remade for television through Sine Novela.

Family
Olvidado's parents are Gregorio Tan and Guarda Olvidado. She lived and received early education in Maranding, Lanao del Norte, Northern Mindanao. Olvidado is the wife of Ruben Marcelino, a former editor-in-chief of the Atlas Publishing Company, with whom she had two children.

Education
She was a student of Chemistry at Adamson University. For two years, she took units of Journalism at the Manuel L. Quezon University.

Influences
Olvidado had been influenced by Carlo J. Caparas, particularly in the field of writing for Philippine comics.

Career

Philippine comics
Olvidado's first serial in Philippine comics was Cha Lee's Angels, a comedy. Her second serial was Kapag Puso ang Nagsasakdal, a drama. Olvidado decided to focus on writing drama in Philippine comics after the satisfactory acceptance of Kapag Puso ang Nagsasakdal by readers. Olvidado authored other Philippine comics novels such as Sinasamba Kita (1982), Dapat Ka Bang Mahalin? (1984), Kung Mahawi Man Ang Ulap (1984), Ina, Kasusuklaman Ba Kita? (1985), Huwag Mo Kaming Isumpa (1986), Huwag Mong Itanong Kung Bakit (1986),
Pinulot Ka Lang sa Lupa (1987), Saan Nagtatago ang Pag-ibig (1987), Magkano ang Iyong Dangal (1988), and Babangon Ako at Dudurgin Kita (1989). Olvidado wrote the Philippine comics novels entitled Mirasol for Gwapo Komiks, Kumurap ang Buwan for Klasik Komiks, and The Babe and the Beast for Super Funny Komix.

Paperbacks
She proceeded to authoring Tagalog romance paperbacks for Valentine Romances, Twin Hearts, and Gemini pocketbooks. In 1993, Olvidado published her own line of Tagalog pocketbook novels.

Newspaper column
Olvidado wrote in the erotica genre in the Brilgint section of the tabloid newspaper Abante.

Screenplays
Olvidado wrote the screenplays for Filipino films such as Tayo na sa Dilim (1990), Maya (1990), and Bakit Kay Tagal ng Sandali (1990).

Television
Olvidado co-wrote the Filipino telenovelas for Sinasamba Kita (2007), Kung Mahawi Man ang Ulap (2007), Babangon Ako’t Dudurugin Kita (2008) and Dapat Ka Bang Mahalin (2009).  She co-wrote the melodrama television shows such as My Only Love (2007-2008) and Kaputol ng Isang Awit (2008).  Olvidado is currently a resident writer of GMA Network.

Radio
Olvidado wrote for the radio serial Dahlia aired over the DWWW radio station.

Awards
Olvidado was awarded Best Story for the film Saan Nagtatago ang Pag-ibig during the 36th FAMAS Awards ceremonies in 1987. FAMAS nominated her for Best Story for the movies entitled Sinasamba Kita (1982), Kung Mahawi Man ang Ulap (1984), at Huwag Mong Itanong Kung Bakit (1988).

Works
The following is an enumeration of Olvidado's works:

Film
Huwag Mo Kaming Isumpa (1981, novel)
Sinasamba Kita (1982, novel)
Kung Mahawi Man Ang Ulap (1984, novel)
Ina, Kasusuklaman Ba Kita (1985, novel)
Pinulot ka lang sa Lupa  (1987, novel)  
Saan Nagtatago Ang Pag-Ibig (1987, novel and screenplay)
Magkano Ang Iyong Dangal (1988, screenplay)
Kung Kasalanan Man (1989, novel and screenplay)
Babangon Ako't Dudurugin Kita (1989, novel and screenplay)
Tayo Na Sa Dilim (1990, screenplay)
Maya (1990, screenplay)
Bakit Kay Tagal ng Sandali (1990, screenplay)

Television

GMA Network
Sinasamba Kita (2007, novel and co-writer)
Kung Mahawi Man Ang Ulap (2007, novel and co-writer)
My Only Love (2007-2008, co-writer)
Kaputol ng Isang Awit (2008, co-writer)
Babangon Ako't Dudurugin Kita (2008, novel and co-writer)
Dapat Ka Bang Mahalin? (2009, novel and co-writer)
Ina, Kasusuklaman Ba Kita? (2009, novel)
Temptation of Wife (2012 TV series) (2012–present, writer,co-producer)
The Half Sisters (2014-2016, writer)

ABS-CBN
Magkano Ang Iyong Dangal? (2010, novel)

See also
Lualhati Bautista

References

External links

Filipino columnists
Filipino comics writers
Filipino novelists
Filipino screenwriters
Filipino television writers
1957 births
Living people
Filipino women novelists
Filipino women columnists
Women erotica writers
GMA Network (company) people
ABS-CBN people
Filipino radio writers
Women radio writers
Tagalog-language writers
Adamson University alumni
Manuel L. Quezon University alumni
People from Cebu City
Writers from Cebu
20th-century novelists
21st-century novelists
20th-century Filipino writers
21st-century Filipino writers
20th-century Filipino women writers
21st-century Filipino women writers
Women television writers
Female comics writers